Hepatic fructokinase (or ketohexokinase) is an enzyme that catalyzes the phosphorylation of fructose to produce fructose-1-phosphate.

ATP +     ADP + 
ATP + D-fructose → ADP + D-fructose-1-phosphate

Pathology
A deficiency is associated with essential fructosuria.

References

External links
 

EC 2.7.1